is a Japanese manga series written by Yuu Kuraishi and illustrated by Kazu Inabe. It started serialization in Kodansha's Monthly Shōnen Rival magazine, before moving to their manga website Manga Box. It was published in ten tankōbon volumes.

Publication
The series was written by Yuu Kuraishi and illustrated by Kazu Inabe. It started serialization in Monthly Shōnen Rival on September 3, 2011. After the magazine was ended, the series was transferred to Manga Box. The series ended in its tenth volume, which was released on October 9, 2015.

The series is licensed in English digitally by Kodansha USA. They released chapters of the series simultaneously with the Japanese release on Crunchyroll Manga. However, the series was removed from Crunchyroll Manga in 2018.

Volume list

Reception
Jason Thompson from Anime News Network listed the series on a list compiling ten great zombie manga series, calling it a "solid, page-turning zombie pulp". Takato from Manga News also praised it, calling it entertaining and suspenseful. Carlo Santos from the same website as Thompson called the series "terrifying and addictive", while also criticizing it for feeling a bit generic sometimes.

See also
My Wife is Wagatsuma-san — Another manga series written by Yuu Kuraishi.
Starving Anonymous — Another manga series by the same authors.

References

External links

Action anime and manga
Horror anime and manga
Kodansha manga
Science fiction anime and manga
Shōnen manga
Webcomics in print
Zombies in anime and manga